The Ateneo de Naga University (Central Bikol: Ateneo de Naga na Unibersidad / Filipino: Pamantasang Ateneo de Naga), also referred to by its acronym AdNU, is a private Catholic Jesuit basic and higher education institution run by the Philippine Province of the Society of Jesus in Naga City, Camarines Sur, Philippines. It was established in 1940 when the Jesuits took over the administration of the diocesan school, Camarines Sur Catholic Academy. The Jesuits renamed the school Ateneo de Naga after taking control. The Jesuits were naming all the schools that they were opening at that time Ateneo. Ateneo de Naga was the fourth school named Ateneo by the Jesuits. Typical of universities in the Philippines, AdNU has primary (since 2014) and secondary departments, which are both coeducational.

History
The Ateneo de Naga University was established in 1940 when American Jesuits took over the Camarines Sur Catholic Academy, a small private school under the supervision of the Diocese of Nueva Caceres, at the invitation of Bishop (later Archbishop) Pedro P. Santos of Caceres. Classes formally started in June 1940 at the building formerly used by the Camarines Sur Catholic Academy (now Naga Parochial School) with 650 elementary and high school students. Meanwhile, Msgr. Santos initiated the construction of the Jesuit faculty house and the Ateneo school building with the now well-known four pillars. These buildings were intended to be turned over to the Jesuits on 15 December 1941. However, this plan was thwarted when the Pacific war broke out. During its first year of operation, it included intermediate grades 4-6 of elementary school. In 1941, however, the elementary school students were transferred to the nearby school run by the Daughters of Charity, and the Ateneo became an all-boys high school. The college department opened on June 5, 1947 and admitted its first female students on October 26, 1953.

On September 16, 1996, the university president, Fr. Raul J. Bonoan, SJ issued a memorandum declaring the separation of the different colleges: the College of Arts and Sciences, the College of Commerce, and the College of Information Technology and Engineering. Almost a year after, the College of Education was created. In 2001, a College of Computer Studies was established. In school year 2004–2005, the university opened the College of Nursing. Most recently, the university opened a law school starting in the first semester of school year 2017–2018. The new College of Law offers a four-year program leading to a Juris Doctor (JD) degree. With these separations and additions, the university now has a total number of 7 colleges.

University status was granted to the Ateneo de Naga on November 11, 1998, upon the approval by the Commission on Higher Education (CHED) on November 11, 1998, of Resolution No. 142-98.

Expansion
From 1947 to 2003, the college and high school were on the same campus, i.e., the Bagumbayan campus which became crowded when AdNU became a university. Student population grew as the university added more undergraduate programs, and the campus open space shrunk as the university built seven new buildings to provide additional facilities to the growing college student population. These seven new buildings are Christ the King University Church, Jesuit Residence, Xavier Hall, Arrupe Hall, Fernando Hall (Conference Hall), O'Brien Hall (James J. O'Brien, S.J. library), the Engineering Building.

In the early 2000s, a ten-hectare land in Barangay Pacol, Naga City, was donated to AdNU. With the availability of a spacious new satellite campus, it was decided to transfer the high school from the Bagumbayan campus to the new satellite campus to decongest the former. This new property named Bonoan Campus became the new home of the high school in the summer of 2003 and also the place where the newly opened grade school was located. With the availability of more land, Ateneo de Naga can now accept a bigger student population. The same year of 2003, the high school became coeducational with the enrollment of 185 female students.

Up to the year 2013, Ateneo de Naga was the only Ateneo without a grade school. On June 4, 2014, AdNU opened its grade school at the Bonoan campus in Barangay Pacol, Naga City when it accepted students for Grades 1–3. Grades one to three classes were held at the high school building while the new grade school building was being constructed. The preschool kindergarten facility (the Ateneo Child Learning Center) was also transferred from the Bagumbayan campus to the Bonoan campus in school year 2014–2015. The preschool and grade school are also coeducational.

Academics
In 1979, the college and High School departments were the first in Camarines Sur to be accredited by the Philippine Accrediting Association of Schools, Colleges and Universities (PAASCU). They were accredited for the third time in 1992. On May 25, 2009, the PAASCU granted institutional accreditation status to Ateneo de Naga, a first for a private educational institution. The Federation of Accrediting Agencies of the Philippines (FAAP) certified AdNU's institutional accreditation on June 22, 2009.

In 2001, Ateneo de Naga was among the first 22 private higher education institutions in the Philippines granted by CHED deregulated status for five years. At the same time CHED recognized its colleges. In 2007, CHED re-designated the College of Computer Studies as a Center for Development for Excellence in Information Technology Education and designated the College of Commerce as Center of Development in Business Administration and also in Entrepreneurship. In 2007 CHED identified the Graduate School as a delivering institution for its Faculty Development Program. On June 2, 2008, CHED granted Ateneo de Naga autonomous status and approved the designation of the College of Education as a Center of Excellence in Teacher Education. The College of Computer Studies was also recognized as a CHED Center of Excellence in Information Technology in 2016.

As of the year 2020, Ateneo de Naga is the only autonomous and institutionally accredited university in Bicol.

In 1991 the Department of Education, Culture and Sports placed the Ateneo in its list of 18 excellent universities and colleges.
 College of Business and Accountancy
 College of Computer Studies
 College of Education
 College of Humanities and Social Sciences
 College of Law
 College of Nursing
 College of Science and Engineering

University press 
Since 2005 the Ateneo has a publishing house for university research work and for outside manuscripts. While its daily operations are managed by the university press director, all publications receive final approval of the university president, upon the recommendation of the University Press Board.

Jesuits honored

The following Jesuits have a building named after them, to honor their services.
 John Joseph Phelan, S.J., science building – for his 40-plus years service.
 James J. O'Brien, S.J., library – for his long years of service.
 Francis D. Burns, S.J.. academic building – first rector, helped establish AdNU, 1940.
 Fr. Raul Bonoan, S.J., Pacol campus and building on Bagumbayan campus – first president.
 Michael Rooney, S.J., high school building – guidance director, Jesuit Superior of Philippines.
 Pedro Arrupe, S.J., convention hall – world-renowned Jesuit, Superior General 1965–83: coined "men and women for others" and gave social justice thrust to contemporary Jesuit education. 
 Richard M. Fernando, S.J., conference hall – sacrificed his life to protect Cambodian students. 
 Francis Xavier, S.J., student organization building – patron saint of the university.

Student publication 
The official tertiary student publication of the university is The Pillars Publication which was founded in 1961. The senior high school student publication is Kurit Bulawan while the junior high school student publication is The Blue and Gold.

Notable alumni

 Diosdado Macapagal-Arroyo: (2010–present) congressman of Second District of Camarines Sur
 Victor Dennis T. Nierva: (2000) poet, teacher, journalist, theatre actor, translator, graphic and book designer
 Jesse Robredo: (2010-2012) Secretary of the Interior and Local Government, (1988-2006) Mayor of the City of Naga
 Raul Roco, Lawyer, Philippine Senator, Education Secretary, Congressman
 Bea Saw, actress and Pinoy Big Brother Season 2 grand winner
 Francis Garchitorena, Lawyer, Former Sandiganbayan Presiding Justice

Notable teachers
 Adrian Remodo, writer known for his achievements in Bikol literature

Gallery

See also
 List of Jesuit educational institutions

References

Universities and colleges in Bicol Region
Universities and colleges in Naga, Camarines Sur
Jesuit universities and colleges in the Philippines
Educational institutions established in 1940
1940 establishments in the Philippines
Schools in Naga, Camarines Sur